Richard Penrose Franklin (28 November 1884 – 12 October 1942) was headmaster of Melbourne Grammar School from 1915 to 1936.

History
Franklin was born at Surbiton, London, the son of Julia Reed Franklin, née Gould and Samuel Franklin, a London solicitor. He was educated at Borlase School, Marlow, and at St. Paul's School, London, where he distinguished himself both scholastically and on the sports field, being both captain of the school and a member of the school's cricket and football teams 1903–1904.
In 1904 he enrolled with Pembroke College, Cambridge, where he achieved first-class honors in classical Tripos and graduated MA.

In 1908 he emigrated to Melbourne, Australia to join the firm of Dalgety & Co but finding his interests lay elsewhere, in late 1910 joined the teaching staff of the Geelong Church of England Grammar School.
In 1909 he joined Sydney Church of England Grammar School ("Shore") as senior housemaster and senior classical master, whose school magazine Torchbearer, gave him a high encomium. His brother Charles Franklin was also a teacher there.
In 1915 he successfully applied for the position of headmaster of Melbourne Grammar School, inducted 21 September, then in 1916 enlisted with the First AIF and served overseas, Henry Girdlestone acting headmaster in his absence.
He returned in 1919 as Lieut. Franklin, and served at Melbourne Grammar until 24 June 1936, when he retired on medical advice. During his time at "Grammar" the school roll had doubled and two important buildings, Grimwade House and Creswick House, had been added by donation.

As an educator, he placed high importance on the "Classics" (Latin and Greek), appointing such eminent scholars as Carl Kaeppel and Harold Hunt to teach those subjects, to the detriment of modern studies, some averred.

He was president of the Head Masters' Association and the Head Masters' Conference of Australia. He was also vice-chairman of the Soldiers' Children's Education Board, and a prominent member of the Victorian Council of Public Education.

He died at his home on Selborne Road, Toorak at the age of 57 years. His remains were cremated at Spring Vale cemetery. He never married.

Major Reginald Norris Franklin DSO (c. 1882 – 6 July 1919) of the 2nd (Queensland) Light Horse, who saw service in Gallipoli and Egypt, was a brother.
Another brother was an instructor at the Naval College.

References 

1884 births
1942 deaths
Australian headmasters
Melbourne Grammar School
English schoolteachers
People from Surbiton
Alumni of Pembroke College, Cambridge
People educated at St Paul's School, London
English emigrants to Australia
Geelong Grammar School